Tekh may refer to:

 TeX, a typesetting system
 Tegh, Armenia - also Tekh

See also
 Tech (disambiguation)
 TEK (disambiguation)